The 1935 Edinburgh West by-election was held on 2 May 1935.  The by-election was held due to the appointed as lord justice general of the incumbent Conservative MP, Wilfrid Normand.  It was won by the Conservative candidate Thomas Cooper.

References

1935 elections in the United Kingdom
1935 in Scotland
1930s elections in Scotland
1930s in Edinburgh
May 1935 events
North, 1935